Nastassia Kinnunen (born March 14, 1985) is a Finnish biathlete and cross-country skier who has competed since 2005. At the 2010 Winter Olympics in Vancouver, she finished 11th in the 4 x 5 km relay, 42nd in the individual sprint, 45th in the 30 km, and 54th in the 7.5 km + 7.5 km double pursuit.

At the FIS Nordic World Ski Championships 2009 in Liberec, Dubarezava finished 41st in the 30 km, 55th in the 7.5 km + 7.5 km double pursuit, and 60th both in the individual sprint and the 10 km events.

Her best World Cup finish was 15th twice in the 4 x 5 km relay (2007, 2009) while her best individual finish was 38th in an individual sprint event in Russia in 2009.

Personal life
Kinnunen moved to Finland in 2017, and she received Finnish citizenship in 2020. She has a daughter with her Finnish husband.

References

External links
 

1985 births
Belarusian female cross-country skiers
Belarusian female biathletes
Finnish female biathletes
Cross-country skiers at the 2010 Winter Olympics
Biathletes at the 2014 Winter Olympics
Living people
Olympic cross-country skiers of Belarus
Olympic biathletes of Belarus
Belarusian emigrants to Finland
Finnish people of Belarusian descent
Naturalized citizens of Finland
Biathletes at the 2022 Winter Olympics
Olympic biathletes of Finland
People from Haradok
Sportspeople from Vitebsk Region